Rio Ave Futebol Clube is a futsal team based in the city of Vila do Conde, Portugal, that plays in the Portuguese Futsal First Division. It is a part of the Rio Ave sports club.

Current squad

References

External links
 Official website
 Zerozero

Futsal clubs in Portugal